The Catalonia women's national futsal team represents Catalonia in international futsal competitions organized by AMF and UEFS. It is controlled by the Catalonia Futsal Federation. They won the 2008 AMF Futsal Women's World Cup.

Tournament records
AMF World Cup record

UEFS European Championship record

Current squad

See also
Catalonia men's national futsal team
Futsal in Catalonia

External links
FCFS Catalonia Federation of Futsal

Futsal in Catalonia
European women's national futsal teams
Futsal